Martius Andreucci (died 1623) was a Roman Catholic prelate who served as Bishop of Trogir (1604–1623).

Biography
On 19 July 1604, Martius Andreucci was appointed during the papacy of Pope Clement VIII as Bishop of Trogir. On 8 August 1604, he was consecrated bishop by Girolamo Bernerio, Cardinal-Bishop of Albano, with Agostino Quinzio, Bishop of Korčula, and Diodato Gentile, Bishop of Caserta serving as co-consecrators. He served as Bishop of Trogir until his death in 1623.

See also 
Catholic Church in Croatia

References

External links and additional sources
 (for Chronology of Bishops)
 (for Chronology of Bishops)

17th-century Roman Catholic bishops in Croatia
Bishops appointed by Pope Clement VIII
Andreucci, Martius
1623 deaths